Akaltara is a nagar palika and tehsil in Janjgir-Champa district  in the state of Chhattisgarh, India. 
It is the birthplace of a great freedom fighter Thakur Chhedi Lal (Barrister). Akaltara has a member in legislation assembly of Chhattisgarh state, which is now represented by Mr. Saurabh Singh of the Bhartiya Janta Party. It is under Janjgir Parliament seat, which is represented by Mrs. Kamla Devi Patle.

Geography
It has an average elevation of 283 metres (928 feet). It is situated in middle of Mahanadi Basin. 28 km eastward from Bilaspur and 17 km westward from Janjgir. Akaltara is on the bottom of Dalha hill.
With an elevation of about 294.4 meter from the sea surface, the Janjgir-Champa district of Chhattisgarh spans over a total land area of 446,674 hectares. Bounded by Korba, Raigarh and Bilaspur, Janjgir-Chmapa district is famous for its high agricultural yield.

Demographics
 India census, Akaltara had a population of 21,333. Males constitute 52% of the population and females 48%. Akaltara has an average literacy rate of 69%, higher than the national average of 59.5%; with 59% of the males and 41% of females literate. 14% of the population is under 6 years of age.

Industries
Akaltara is famous for limestone and rice mills. Many crushers and rice mills are spread around city. CCI Akaltara and Nuvoco Vistas Corp. Ltd. Arasmeta are cement plants of Akaltara. KSK Energy Ventures Ltd is constructing KSK Mahanadi Power Project a 3600 MW thermal power plant at Nariyara village in Akaltara. There Is Vardha Power Plant Created 2010 & Work Is Still In Progress.

Transport
Akaltara is a station on the Tatanagar–Bilaspur section of Howrah-Nagpur-Mumbai line.

Tehsil
Akaltara is one of nine blocks in Janjgir-Champa District. There are 52.5 villages in Akaltara Block.
Villages of Akaltara
1.	Aarasmeta
2.	Akaltari
3.	Amartal
4.	Amlipali
5.	Amora
6.	Arjuni
7.	Bamhani
8.	Banahil
9.	Bargawan
10.	Barpali
11.	Bhaistara
12.	Birkoni
13.	Buchihardi
14.	Changori
15.	Farhada
16.	Hardi
17.	Jhalmala
18.	Kalyanpur
19.	Kapan
20.	Karumahu
21.	Katghari
22.	Katnai
23.	Khatola
24.	Khisora
25.	Khond
26.	Kirari
27.	Kotgarh
28.	Kotmi Sonar
29.	Latiya
30.	Madhuwa
31.	Mahmadpur 
32.	Murlidih
33.	Nariyara
34.	Pachari
35.	Padariya
36.	Pakariya (jhulan)
37.	Pakariya (latiya)
38.	Parsada
39.	Parsahibana
40.	Parsahinala
41.	Piparda
42.	Piparsatti
43.	Pondidalla
44.	Pouna
45.	Raseda
46.	Sajapali
47.	Sankar
48.	Sonadula
49.	Sonsari
50.	Taga
51.	Taroud
52.	Tilai

References

Cities and towns in Janjgir-Champa district